The Lori Berd Hydro Power Plant is a proposed hydroelectric power plant in the village of Lori Berd in Armenia's northern province of Lori along the Dzoraget River.

See also

 Energy in Armenia

References

Hydroelectric power stations in Armenia